Tower Hobbies was started in 1971 by Bruce Holecek, a hobbies enthusiast.  Tower Hobbies is now a division of Horizon Hobby, LLC,  which is headquartered in Champaign, Illinois, United States.

References

External links
 Official Site

Champaign, Illinois
Companies based in Champaign County, Illinois